Polymerase (DNA-directed), epsilon 4, accessory subunit is a protein that in humans is encoded by the POLE4 gene.

Function

POLE4 is a histone-fold protein that interacts with other histone-fold proteins to bind DNA in a sequence-independent manner. These histone-fold protein dimers combine within larger enzymatic complexes for DNA transcription, replication, and packaging.

References

Further reading